Orlin Chalmers (born January 30, 1982) is a former Canadian soccer player who played his entire career in his native country of Canada.

Playing career
Chalmers began his professional career at the youth level overseas in France with FC Cannes, after returning to Canada to play with the Hamilton Thunder of the Canadian Professional Soccer League in 2002. After an impressive start to the season he was loaned out along with three other players to the Calgary Storm of the USL A-League. After appearing in six matches with the Storm he was called back to Hamilton on July 21, 2002. On August 27, 2003 he was traded to Toronto Croatia for Peter Curic and Josip Bucic. He made his debut for Croatia on September 5, 2003 in a match against the Mississauga Olympians in a 3-0 victory.

He helped Toronto finish third in the Western Conference allowing the club to clinch a postseason berth. In the quarterfinals match Chalmers scored the lone goal for Croatia against the Brampton Hitmen in a 1-1 draw, and scored a successful goal in the penalty shootout which Croatia won. The victory was short lived due to Croatia fielding an illegal player which eliminated the club from playoff contention. The following season he helped the Toronto side reach the postseason by finishing as runners up in the Western Conference. In 2006, he signed with the Oakville Blue Devils and helped Oakville claim the National Division title. He played the remainder of his career with the club, which was renamed Brampton Lions in 2007, assisting the club by reaching the playoffs in all of his years of service with the club.

Honors

Oakville Blue Devils
Canadian Soccer League National Division Champions (1): 2006

References 

Living people
1982 births
Brampton United players
Canadian soccer players
Canadian Soccer League (1998–present) players
Calgary Storm players
Hamilton Thunder players
Toronto Croatia players
A-League (1995–2004) players
Association football defenders